Killingly High School is a public high school in Killingly, Connecticut. The school reported 792 students and 65 FTE classroom teachers for the 2014–2015 school year. Killingly High is the only public high school in the Killingly School District, which is on the eastern edge of Windham County. It also serves the nearby town of Brooklyn.

For 2015, the community voted to make the school the sole polling place in Killingly. The Secretary of State informed the town registrar's office that this was a misinterpretation of statute, and in 2016, a second polling place was opened at the school's old location.

Sports at the school are done as part of the Eastern Connecticut Conference.

Killingly High was included in a segment of the reality TV series The Principal's Office in 2009.

Old Killingly High School was built in 1908 and used by the school until 1965. The second building was then used until 2010 and continues to act as the site of an alternative learning program and the school district's central office. The first building was listed on the National Register of Historic Places in 1992 and is now the town's community center.

Mascot controversies 
In 2014 school officials began discussing changing the school's mascot name, The Redmen, in response to controversy over Native American mascots.

In 2019, another student group advocated for a name change and brought the issue back into the news. Students and the community pushed back: a petition on change.org titled REDMEN FOREVER!!! that asks the Board of Ed to keep the name gathered over 3,000 signatures and the local paper, The Killingly Villager, ran 7 letters to the editor in the op-ed section about the issue, all 7 in opposition to a name change and none in favor of a name change. A website in favor of the name change, killinglyredmen.com, was launched on June 21, 2019. Red Hawks was selected as the new mascot by 80% of students in an October, 2019 vote. On January 9, 2020, the Board of Education voted to reinstate "Redmen" with a redesigned logo to reduce the impression of a negative stereotype.

Notable alumni 

 Bruce Boisclair, New York Mets outfielder
 Shane Gibson, professional basketball player
 Eric Laakso, Miami Dolphins professional football player (NFL)

See also
 List of secondary school sports team names and mascots derived from indigenous peoples

References

External links
 
 

Public high schools in Connecticut
Killingly, Connecticut
Schools in Windham County, Connecticut
Educational institutions established in 1908
1908 establishments in Connecticut